Valery Gennadjevitch Belov (born 24 January 1967) is a retired Russiann professional ice hockey player who most last served as head coach of HC Vityaz of the Kontinental Hockey League (KHL).

He is the former player for HC Dynamo Moscow and coach of HC Dynamo Moscow with Zinetula Bilyaletdinov. He won the Russian league championship with Dynamo in 1995 and played for the Russian national team in the 1993–94 and 1994−95 seasons.

References

External links

1967 births
Living people
Russian ice hockey players
Ice hockey people from Moscow